Two Harbors station is a historic train station located on Sixth Street in Two Harbors, Minnesota. The station was built in 1907.  The large two-story depot was the third depot on the site. The Minnesota Iron Company developed the Duluth and Iron Range Railroad in 1883, laid out the town of Two Harbors in 1885, and built depots to conducts its business.  When the rail line was completed to Duluth, it was used as a transfer point for passengers, lumber, and mining supplies.  When passenger service ended in 1961, the depot was donated to Lake County. The building was listed on the National Register of Historic Places in 1983 as the Duluth and Iron Range Railroad Company Depot.

Lake County Historical Society Depot Museum
The Lake County Historical Society now uses the building as the Lake County Historical Society Depot Museum. Exhibits focus on the pioneer history of Lake County.  Displays include early Native Americans, local mining and logging industries, the railroad, military service, children's toys and dolls, butterflies, and local personal collections.

References

External links

Lake County Historical Society

Railway stations in the United States opened in 1907
Railway stations closed in 1961
Railway stations on the National Register of Historic Places in Minnesota
History museums in Minnesota
Museums in Lake County, Minnesota
Former Duluth, Missabe and Iron Range Railway stations
1907 establishments in Minnesota
1961 disestablishments in Minnesota
National Register of Historic Places in Lake County, Minnesota
Former railway stations in Minnesota